The holy places of Ayyavazhi includes the following 

Primary Pathis

 Swamithope pathi
 Ambala Pathi
 Mutta Pathi
 Thamaraikulam Pathi
 Poo Pathi

Other Pathis
 Vaikunda pathi
 Vakai Pathi
 Avathara Pathi

Primary Thangals

 Chettikudiyiruppu
 Agastheeswaram
 Paloor
 Sundavilai
 Vadalivilai
 Kadambankulam
 Pambankulam

Other Important Thangals

 Vellai Chuvamiyar Pathi
 Veppankattu Pathi
 Pazhavar
 Sidambara puram
 Kalakkadu
 Thysaiyan Vilai

Other holy sites

 Vaikunda Malai
 Marunthuvazh Malai

See also

List of Ayyavazhi-related articles
Pancha pathi

References
 R. Shunmugam (2000), Nadar Kulathi Narayanar Avataram, Nadar Kuladeepam Publications.

Ayyavazhi
Religious places